Shinako (written: 姿子 or 品子) is a feminine Japanese given name. Notable people with the name include:

, Japanese beach volleyball player
, Japanese politician

Japanese feminine given names